The Sulina branch is a distributary of the river Danube, that contributes in forming the Danube Delta. 

The other two main branches of the Danube are the Chilia branch to the north and the Sfântu Gheorghe branch to the south.

The Sulina branch runs straight east, starting at Tulcea and reaching the Black Sea at the port of Sulina. 

Distributaries of the Danube